The Humanitarian Coalition (French: La Coalition Humanitaire) brings together 12 Canadian non-governmental organizations consisting of Action Against Hunger, Canadian Foodgrains Bank, Canadian Lutheran World Relief, CARE Canada, Doctors of the World, Humanity & Inclusion, Islamic Relief Canada, Oxfam Canada, Oxfam-Québec, Plan International Canada, Save the Children Canada and World Vision Canada. 

The Humanitarian Coalition's stated mission is "to bring together leading aid organizations to provide Canadians with a simple and effective way to help during international humanitarian disasters. Member agencies join forces to raise funds, partner with the government, and mobilize media, businesses and individual Canadians."

Since 2010, the Humanitarian Coalition has launched appeals for the Ukraine crisis in 2022, the Haiti earthquake in 2021, the Beirut blast in 2020, that  Cylone Idai in 2019, the Hunger Crisis affecting parts of Africa and Yemen in 2017, the Syrian Refugee Crisis in 2015-2016, the Nepal earthquake in 2015, the Ebola Outbreak in 2014, the food crisis in the Sahel in 2012, the drought in East Africa in 2011, the earthquake in Japan in 2011, the floods in Pakistan in 2010 and the earthquake in Haiti in 2010. 

Previous emergencies include Typhoon Rai in the Philippines (2021), Cyclone Eloise in Mozambique (2021), Hurricane Eta in Honduras, Nicaragua, and Guatemala (2020), forest fire in Bolivia (2019), flooding in Sudan (2019).

Governance 
The Board of Directors is made up of the respective CEO or Executive Director of the member agencies. The current board includes:

 Andy Harrington: Canadian Foodgrains Bank
 Karin Achtelstetter: Canadian Lutheran World Relief
 Barbara Grantham: CARE Canada
 Usama Khan: Islamic Relief Canada
 Lauren Ravon: Oxfam Canada
 Béatrice Vaugrante: Oxfam-Québec
 Lindsay Glassco: Plan International Canada
 Danny Glenwright: Save the Children Canada
 Michael Messenger: World Vision Canada

The day-to-day activities of the Humanitarian Coalition are run by the organisation's secretariat based in Ottawa, Ontario, Canada. The current Executive Director of the Humanitarian Coalition is Richard Morgan.

Emergency responses 
The Humanitarian Coalition has responded to 24 major emergencies and 77 smaller-scale disasters since 2005. More than $120 million has been mobilized to meet the emergency needs of 27 million people.

Reports and Publications 
The Humanitarian Coalition reports regularly on its activities. Annual reports and Crisis-specific reports are available on its website in English and in French.

International counterparts
Around the world, agencies have begun to collaborate and launch joint appeals. Successful national humanitarian appeal mechanisms include the Disasters Emergency Committee (UK), Aktion Deutschland (Germany), Japan Platform (Japan)  and others. Together, they form the Emergency Appeals Alliance .

References

External links

Charities based in Canada